Åke Edwardson (born 10 March 1953 in Eksjö, Småland) is a Swedish author of detective fiction, and was previously a lecturer in journalism at Gothenburg University, the city where many of his Inspector Winter novels are set. Edwardson has had many jobs, including as a journalist and press officer for the United Nations and his crime novels have made him a three-time winner of the Swedish Crime Writers' Academy Award for best crime novel. His first novel to be translated into English, in 2005, was Sun and Shadow. The second, Never End, followed in 2006. In a Spiegel Online interview on June 21, 2008, Edwardson declared that he would not write any more crime novels after 10 episodes about his protagonist Winter.

Bibliography
 Till allt som varit dött (1995)
 Gå ut min själ (1996)
 Genomresa (1999)
 Jukebox (2003)
 Winterland (2004)
 Samurajsommar (2005) (young adult fiction)
 Rum nummer 10 (2005)
 Drakmånad (2006) (young adult fiction)
 Vänaste land (2006)
 Nästan död man (2007)
 Den sista vintern (2008)

Inspector Erik Winter series
 Dans med en ängel (1997) Erik Winter novel translated as 'Death Angels' by Ken Schubert (2009)
 Rop från långt avstånd (1998) Erik Winter novel translated as 'The Shadow Woman' by Per Carlsson (2010)
 Sun and Shadow: an Erik Winter novel (translated by Laurie Thompson) (Sol och skugga 1999)
 Never End: an Erik Winter novel (translated by Laurie Thompson) (Låt det aldrig ta slut, 2000)
 Frozen Tracks: an inspector Erik Winter novel (translated by Laurie Thompson) (Himlen är en plats på jorden 2001)
 Segel av sten (2002) Erik Winter novel, translated as 'Sail of Stone' (2012)
 Room No. 10: Erik Winter Series #7(2013)
Several of the books have been adapted for television. Winter was played first by Johan Gry and later by Magnus Krepper.

References

External links
 Author's website (in Swedish)

1953 births
Living people
People from Eksjö Municipality
Writers from Småland
Swedish crime fiction writers
Academic staff of the University of Gothenburg